Monzón District is one of eleven districts of the province Huamalíes in Peru.

References